was a town located in Tamana District, Kumamoto Prefecture, Japan.

As of 2005, the town had an estimated population of 6,523 and a density of 170 persons per km². The total area was 38.27 km².

On March 1, 2006, Kikusui, along with the town of Mikawa (also from Tamana District), was merged to create the town of Nagomi and no longer exists as an independent municipality.

External links
 Official website of Nagomi 

Dissolved municipalities of Kumamoto Prefecture